The 2019 Wiesbaden Tennis Open was a professional tennis tournament played on outdoor clay courts. It was the eleventh edition of the tournament which was part of the 2019 ITF Women's World Tennis Tour. It took place in Wiesbaden, Germany between 29 April and 5 May 2019.

Singles main-draw entrants

Seeds

 1 Rankings are as of 22 April 2019.

Other entrants
The following players received wildcards into the singles main draw:
  Mira Antonitsch
  Katharina Gerlach
  Kathleen Kanev
  Stephanie Wagner

The following player received entry using a junior exempt:
  Clara Tauson

The following player received entry by a special exempt:
  Elizabeth Halbauer

The following players received entry from the qualifying draw:
  Jaimee Fourlis
  Julie Gervais
  Réka Luca Jani
  Eléonora Molinaro
  Laura-Ioana Paar
  Hélène Scholsen

Champions

Singles

 Barbora Krejčíková def.  Katarina Zavatska, 6–4, 7–6(7–2)

Doubles

 Anna Blinkova /  Yanina Wickmayer def.  Jaimee Fourlis /  Kathinka von Deichmann, 6–3, 4–6, [10–3]

References

External links
 2019 Wiesbaden Tennis Open at ITFtennis.com
 Official website

2019 ITF Women's World Tennis Tour
2019 in German tennis
Tennis tournaments in Germany
Clay court tennis tournaments